Maurice Mességué (14 December 1921 – 16 June 2017) was a French herbalist and author of several books on herbal medicine and cooking with herbs. In his autobiography, he claims to have treated Winston Churchill, Chancellor Adenauer of Germany, and the future Pope John XXIII.

He was born in Colayrac-Saint-Cirq (Lot-et-Garonne).

In 1971, he was elected the Mayor of the town of Fleurance.

Mességué practices a form of herbalism passed down through his family. Some of the practices involve, among other things, soaking the patient's feet and hands in a strong concoction of locally gathered herbs.

References 

 Of People and Plants: The Autobiography of Europe's Most Celebrated Healer by Maurice Mességué

External links
 Rosalee de la Forêt's biography 

1921 births
2017 deaths
Herbalists
People from Lot-et-Garonne